Jessie Dotson can refer to:

 Jessie Dotson (scientist)
 Jessie Dotson, who committed the Lester Street murders